Farmer Boys is a German metal band from Stuttgart. They reached their peak of popularity with their album The World Is Ours, released in 2000; the videos for singles "Here Comes the Pain" and "If You Ever Leave Me Standing" were put into heavy rotation by German alternative music channels such as VIVA Zwei. Farmer Boys has obtained a cult following in later years.

Their musical style is a blend of Machine Head's groove metal and Paradise Lost's gothic metal; their lyrical matter, however, unusually to the style, often revolves around the darker side of agriculture – bestiality and incest ("Farm Sweet Farm"), torture of animals ("When a Chicken Cries for Love"), suicide ("Relieve the Tension") and slaughterhouses ("When Pigs Fly"). Their later albums have strayed away from the subject matter.

Matthias Sayer also provided guest vocals for Apocalyptica's single "Hope Vol. 2".

Four years after the release of The Other Side, in 2004, the group performed a reunion concert in Stuttgart on 22 December. Aside from their appearance at the 2011 Summer Breeze Open Air on 20 August in Dinkelsbühl, Germany, the band remained relatively silent and inactive.

At the end of 2016, guitarist Alexander Scholpp announced the return of the band, with three shows scheduled in Germany for the spring of 2017, as well announcing the band's plans for a new album. The album, named Born Again, was released in 2018.

Members 
 Matthias Sayer – vocals
 Alexander Scholpp – guitars
 Richard Duee – keyboards
 Timm Schreiner – drums
 Ralf Botzenhart – bass (–1999, 2014–)

Former members 
 Antonio Ieva – bass (1999–2014)
 Dennis Hummel – keyboards
 Till Hartmann – drums

Discography

Albums

Singles 
Farmer Boys (cardboard promo single) (1995)
Farm Sweet Farm (1996)
Never Let Me Down Again (Depeche Mode cover; featuring Anneke van Giersbergen) (1996)
Till The Cows Come Home (1997)
When Pigs Fly (1997)
If You Ever Leave Me Standing (2000)
Here Comes the Pain (2000)
While God Was Sleeping (promotional single) (2001)
Stay Like This Forever (2004)
You and Me (2017)
Revolt (2018)
Tears of Joy (2018)
Isle of the Dead (2020)

Music videos 
Farm Sweet Farm
Never Let Me Down Again
When Pigs Fly
Here Comes the Pain
If You Ever Leave Me Standing
While God Was Sleeping
Stay Like This Forever
You and Me
Revolt 
Isle of Dead (Acoustic)

References

External links 
 Official site
 Tieflader, a band featuring Alex Scholpp
 Stereo.Pilot, a band featuring Antonio Ieva
 Dacia & The WMD, a band featuring Alex Scholpp and Ralf Botzenhart 

1994 establishments in Germany
German heavy metal musical groups
Musical groups established in 1994
Musical quintets